Donja Voća is a municipality in Croatia in Varaždin County. According to the 2011 census, there are 2,443 inhabitants.

The settlements are:
 Budinščak, population 109
 Donja Voća, population 1,059
 Fotez Breg, population 64
 Gornja Voća, population 571
 Jelovec Voćanski, population 86
 Plitvica Voćanska, population 68
 Rijeka Voćanska, population 264
 Slivarsko, population 222

References

External links
 

Municipalities of Croatia
Populated places in Varaždin County